Boco may refer to:

 Boco, Les Anglais, a village of Haiti
 Boco River, a river in Portugal
 Boco (Final Fantasy) or Boko, a fictional character in the video game series Final Fantasy
 BoCo (The Railway Series), a fictional diesel locomotive in The Railway Series books
 BoCo (Thomas and Friends), the corresponding character in the adapted  TV series Thomas and Friends
 Romuald Boco, Beninese football player
 BoCo, a locomotive wheel arrangement description using the UIC classification system
 BoCo, an informal moniker for The Boston Conservatory
 Boco, a small agricultural locality or Townland in the Quillota Province, Chile
 BoCO, an abbreviation of the town Boulder, Colorado

See also
 Boeing Company
 Boko (disambiguation)